Güven Yalçın (born 18 January 1999) is a Turkish professional footballer who plays as a forward for  club Genoa.

Club career
Yalçın spent his entire youth development with Bayer Leverkusen, joining them in 2006. On 27 July 2018, Yalçın signed with Beşiktaş in Turkish Süper Lig. Yalçın made his professional debut for Beşiktaş in a 1-1 2018–19 UEFA Europa League qualifier against FK Partizan on 23 August 2018.

On 1 February 2021 he was signed by Italian side Lecce on loan with an option to buy.

On 21 July 2022, Yalçın returned to Italy and signed with Genoa.

International career
Yalçın was born in Germany and is of Turkish descent. He first represented the Turkey U17, and then represented the Germany U18s in a 3-0 friendly win over the Austria U18s on 17 April 2017. He then switched back to represent the Turkey U19s, with whom he participated in the 2018 UEFA European Under-19 Championship.

He made his Turkey national football team debut on 30 May 2019, in a friendly against Greece, as a 55th-minute substitute for Cenk Tosun.

Honours

Beşiktaş
Turkish Super Cup: 2021

References

External links
 
 
 
 
 JK profile
 DFB Profile
 

1999 births
Living people
Footballers from Düsseldorf
Turkish footballers
Turkey youth international footballers
Turkey under-21 international footballers
Turkey international footballers
German footballers
Germany youth international footballers
German people of Turkish descent
Beşiktaş J.K. footballers
U.S. Lecce players
Genoa C.F.C. players
Süper Lig players
Serie B players
Association football forwards
Turkish expatriate footballers
Expatriate footballers in Italy
Turkish expatriate sportspeople in Italy